Leonel Di Plácido (born 28 January 1994) is an Argentine professional footballer who plays as a right-back for Botafogo, on loan from Lanús.

Club career
Di Plácido started his professional career in Floresta, Buenos Aires with then-Primera División club All Boys in 2013, however his first appearance for the team came in 2014 in a league defeat against Newell's Old Boys. His first five appearances for All Boys were off the bench so he had to wait until 17 April to start a match, versus Arsenal de Sarandí, which ended with him scoring his first goal of his career, an 84th-minute equaliser assisted by Javier Cámpora. However, it was not a good season for All Boys as they suffered relegation into the Primera B Nacional.

In 2014, his second season with All Boys, he participated in fifteen matches over two competitions and scored his second goal; against Unión. 2015 turned out to be Di Plácido's most prominent and last season with the club as he played thirty-five times before departing to join Atlético Tucumán on loan until June 2017 in 2016. He made his debut for his new club on 19 February against Unión. On 24 August 2017, Di Plácido completed a permanent transfer to Lanús. He made his Lanús debut in a home defeat to Boca Juniors on 10 September.

International career
Di Plácido was called up to the Argentina national team by Lionel Scaloni for friendlies in September 2018 with Guatemala and Colombia; though remained on the bench for both fixtures.

Personal life
On 1 September 2020, it was confirmed that Di Plácido had tested positive for COVID-19 amid the pandemic; having shown symptoms a week prior.

Career statistics
.

References

External links

1994 births
Living people
Footballers from Buenos Aires
Argentine people of Italian descent
Argentine footballers
Association football defenders
Argentine Primera División players
Primera Nacional players
All Boys footballers
Atlético Tucumán footballers
Club Atlético Lanús footballers